is a Japanese former professional baseball player. He played a total of 19 years for the Tokyo Yakult Swallows. He began his career as a pitcher, and later converted to an outfielder following the 2009 season. Starting with the 2022 season, he will be a hitting coach with the Tohoku Rakuten Golden Eagles.

Career
Takai began his career in 2003 with the Yakult Swallows, making his NPB debut on April 22, 2003. On September 28, 2021, Takai announced he would be retiring from professional baseball following the 2021 season.

External links

 NPB.com

1984 births
Living people
Baseball people from Kanagawa Prefecture
Japanese expatriate baseball players in the United States
Waikiki Beach Boys players
Nippon Professional Baseball outfielders
Yakult Swallows players
Tokyo Yakult Swallows players